In Polynesian mythology,  (also rendered as  in Cook Islands Māori,  in Samoan,  in Tahitian,  in Hawaiian) is the original home of the Polynesians, before dispersal across Polynesia. It also features as the underworld in many Māori stories.

Anne Salmond states Havaii is the old name for Raiatea, the homeland of the Māori.  When British explorer James Cook first sighted New Zealand in 1769, he had Tupaia on board, a Raiatean navigator and linguist.  Cook's arrival seemed to be a confirmation of a prophecy by Toiroa, a priest from Māhia.  At Tolaga Bay, Tupaia conversed with the tohunga associated with the school of learning located there, called Te Rawheoro.  The priest asked about the Maori homelands, 'Rangiatea' (Ra'iatea), 'Hawaiki' (Havai'i, the ancient name for Ra'iatea), and 'Tawhiti' (Tahiti).

Etymology 
Linguists have reconstructed the term to Proto-Nuclear Polynesian *sawaiki.

The Māori word  figures in traditions about the arrival of the Māori in Aotearoa, present day New Zealand. The same concept appears in other Polynesian cultures, the name appearing variously as Havaiki, Havaii, or Avaiki in other Polynesian languages. Hawaiki or the misspelling "Hawaiiki" appear to have become the most common variants used in English.

On several island groups, including New Zealand and the Marquesas, the term has been recorded as associated with the mythical underworld and death. William Wyatt Gill wrote at length in the nineteenth century recounting the legends about Avaiki as the underworld or Hades of Mangaia in the Cook Islands. Gill (1876:155) records a proverb: Ua po Avaiki, ua ao nunga nei – 'Tis night now in spirit-land, for 'tis light in this upper world." Tregear (1891:392) also records the term Avaiki as meaning "underworld" at Mangaia, probably sourced from Gill. The proposed origin of Hawaiki being both the ancestral homeland and the underworld is that both are the dwelling places of ancestors and the spirits.

According to Thor Heyerdahl,  was said to lie east of the island. Sebastian Englert records:

 
 Translation: "The island towards the sun, above! Go, see the island where King Hotu Matua will go and live!"

Englert puts forward the claim that  lies to the West of the island. It is also notable that in the Hawaiian Islands, the ancestral homeland is called , a cognate of Tahiti, where at least part of the Hawaiian population came from.

Legends 

According to various oral traditions, the Polynesians migrated from Hawaiki to the islands of the Pacific Ocean in open canoes, little different from the traditional craft found in Polynesia today.
The Māori people of New Zealand trace their ancestry to groups of people who reportedly travelled from Hawaiki in about 40 named waka (compare the discredited Great Fleet theory of the Polynesian settlement of New Zealand).

Polynesian oral traditions say that the spirits of Polynesian people return to Hawaiki after death. In the New Zealand context, such return-journeys take place via Spirits Bay, Cape Reinga and the  Three Kings Islands at the extreme north of the North Island of New Zealand. This may indicate the direction in which Hawaiki may lie.

Modern science and practical testing of theories 

Until the early 21st century, many anthropologists had doubts that the canoe-legends described a deliberate migration. They tended to believe that the migration occurred accidentally when seafarers became lost and drifted to uninhabited shores.

In 1947 Thor Heyerdahl sailed the Kon-Tiki, a balsa-wood raft, from South America into the Pacific in an attempt to show that humans could have settled Polynesia from the eastern shores of the Pacific Ocean, with sailors using the prevailing winds and simple construction techniques.

However, DNA, linguistic, botanical, and archaeological evidence all indicate that the Austronesian-speaking peoples (including the Polynesians) probably originated from islands in eastern Asia, possibly from present-day Taiwan. From there they gradually migrated southwards and eastwards through the South Pacific Ocean.

The sweet potato, which is of South American origin, is widely cultivated in Polynesia. This suggests that some interaction between the Polynesians and the Amerindians of South America may have taken place. No Polynesian crops were introduced into the Americas, and there is possible evidence of Polynesian contact only in Chile. Austronesian and Polynesian navigators may have deduced the existence of uninhabited islands by observing migratory patterns of birds.

In recent decades, boatbuilders (see Polynesian Voyaging Society) have constructed ocean-going craft using traditional materials and techniques. They have sailed them over presumed traditional routes using ancient navigation methods, showing the feasibility of such deliberate migration that make use of prevailing winds.

See also 
Hawaiʻiloa
Hōkūleʻa
Kupe
Percy Smith
Urheimat
Polynesian navigation

Footnotes

References 

Buse, J., Taringa, R., Cook Islands Maori Dictionary With English Finderlist, edited by Biggs, B. and Moeka'a R. (1996), 90. Canberra: The Australian National University.
 M. Taumoefolau, "From *Sau 'Ariki to Hawaiki". The Journal of the Polynesian Society, 105(4), (1996), 385–410.
 E. R. Tregear, Maori-Polynesian Comparative Dictionary (Lyon and Blair: Lambton Quay), 1891.

External links 
Hawaiki in Te Ara – the Encyclopedia of New Zealand

Origin hypotheses of ethnic groups
Mythological islands
Polynesian mythology
Māori underworld